This is the discography of Malaysian singer-songwriter Mizz Nina. It consists of two studio albums, seven singles (including one as a featured artist), three promotional singles and twelve music videos (including one as a featured artist).

Albums

Studio albums

Groups albums

Teh Tarik Crew
 Are We Rap Stars Now (2000) 
 How’s The Level? (2004) 
 What’s Next? (2007)

Singles

As main artist

As featured artist

Promotional singles

Music videos

1As featured artist.
This list does not include music video teasers, behind-the-scenes or the-making-of music videos, live acoustic sessions and live performances.

References

Discographies of Malaysian artists